CenturyTel of the Midwest-Kendall, LLC is one of the CenturyLink operating companies in Wisconsin. The company's cities include Peshtigo, Kendall, and Marinette.

History
The company was operated as Novy Telephone Company from 1934 through 1988, then in 1989 was sold to an employee who operated as Kendall Telephone, Inc.. The company became CenturyTel of the Midwest - Kendall, Inc. in 1998. In 2001, the original company's assets were merged into a new company named CenturyTel of the Midwest-Kendall, LLC, which is simply a reincorporation of the original company in Delaware.

In 1998, CenturyTel acquired 89,000 telephone lines from Ameritech, which operated the lines through its Wisconsin Bell subsidiary. The lines were transferred to CenturyTel of the Midwest-Kendall.

Proposed sale
On August 3, 2021, Lumen announced its sale of its local telephone assets in 20 states to Apollo Global Management, including Wisconsin.

References

See also
CenturyLink
Wisconsin Bell

Lumen Technologies
AT&T subsidiaries
Communications in Wisconsin
Telecommunications companies established in 1989
Telecommunications companies of the United States
American companies established in 1989
1989 establishments in Kansas